Roel de Vries is the name of:

 Roel de Vries (engineer) (born 1968), Dutch engineer and businessman
 Roel de Vries (trade unionist) (born 1943), former Dutch trade union leader